The Românești is a right tributary of the river Valea Neagră in Romania. It flows into the Valea Neagră in Trifești.

References

Rivers of Romania
Rivers of Neamț County